Chipper Lowell is an American comedian and magician. Lowell was born in Massachusetts, United States, to a circus-travelling family. At the age of 17, he began performing solo shows.  Lowell's influences include vaudeville, stand-up comedy, and improvisational comedy. In addition to performing live shows, he is a writer, producer and consultant for theater, television and film projects.

References

External links
 Official website

21st-century American comedians
Living people
Year of birth missing (living people)